Sunday with Laura Kuenssberg is a BBC political programme presented by Laura Kuenssberg, broadcast on BBC One every Sunday morning. Its also simulcast by BBC News Channel and occasionally by BBC World News, depending on content and interviews.

The programme replaced The Andrew Marr Show as the network's flagship Sunday talk show, after Andrew Marr resigned from the BBC to front a talk show on LBC in 2021. Similar to the previous Sunday morning programmes that came before, Sunday with Laura Kuenssberg interviews political figures and others involved in the current events of the week in every episode.

The programme is broadcast from Studio B of Broadcasting House in London, the same studio that BBC News at Six and BBC News at Ten are broadcast from.

Background 
In March 2022, it was announced that Kuenssberg, who had left the role as BBC News' political editor, would be replacing Andrew Marr in a full time role as the host of BBC One's flagship Sunday morning politics show, which was announced to be starting in September 2022.

In an interview Kuenssberg did with British Vogue on 23 August 2022, it was announced that the show would release from 4 September 2022.

More details about the programme were released on 28 August 2022, which included a short trailer of Kuenssberg talking to a politician from their point of view. The show does not have the traditional Sunday paper review section, instead it just highlights the front pages of the day's newspapers, or a BBC News Summary.

Series overview

Reception 
Jim Waterson of The Guardian said "...in a sign of the declining importance of the print press, Kuenssberg’s new show has broken with the Sunday political show tradition of having a formal in-depth newspaper review. Instead, the front pages were flashed on screen for a few seconds – meaning the Mail on Sunday headline “BBC Comic’s C-word jibe against PM” was barely visible."
The first episode had 1.5 million viewers.

The debut episode also gathered attention due to the comments from comedian Joe Lycett who was a panellist, including questions from a Tory MP in a Commons committee.

References

External links 

2022 British television series debuts
2020s British political television series
2020s British television talk shows
BBC television news shows
BBC television talk shows
English-language television shows
Sunday morning talk shows